Skarbek (archaic feminine by marriage: Skarbkowa, archaic feminine by  birth: Skarbkówna) is a Polish language surname, which originally meant a rich individual or miser, derived from the word skarb, meaning "treasure" or "wealth". The name may refer to:

 Skarbek family (Skarbkowie) a Polish noble family of Abdank coat of arms raised to the rank of untitled nobility in the 11th century; branches of the family were granted the title of count in Galicia in 1778 and in Austria and Russia in 1835.
 Alfred Skarbek Korzybski (1879–1950), Polish philosopher
 Andrew Skarbek (born 1967 or 1968), Australian game show winner
 Andrzej Skarbek (1925–2011), Polish psychiatrist and psychotherapist
 Anna Skarbek (born 1976), Australian businesswoman 
 Charlie Skarbek (born 1953), British musician
 Fryderyk Skarbek (1792–1866), Polish economist
 Honorata Skarbek (born 1992), Polish singer
 Krystyna Skarbek (1908–1952), Polish intelligence agent
 Maria Skarbkowa,   name by the first marriage of Maria Wodzińska  (1819–1896), Polish artist who was once engaged to composer Frédéric Chopin
 Marjorie Skarbek (born 1944), British writer
 Rafał Skarbek-Malczewski, Polish snowboarder
 Sacha Skarbek (born 1972), British musician
 Stefan Skarbek (born 1979), British musician

References

Polish-language surnames